

Final standings
Note: GP = Games played, W = Wins, L = Losses, T = Ties, OTL = Overtime losses, GF = Goals for, GA = Goals against, Pts = Points.

Playoffs
Toronto Aeros 5, Montreal Axion 4 (OT)
The Toronto Aeros won the Championship of the NWHL.

Notable players
Future two-time Olympic Gold Medalist Gina Kingsbury played the 2004-05 season with the Montreal Axion of the National Women's Hockey League. She led the team with 31 goals and added 29 assists, finishing the 30-game season with 60 points.

See also
 National Women's Hockey League (1999–2007) (NWHL)

References

National Women's Hockey League (1999–2007) seasons
NWHL